Tetraspanin 18 is a protein that in humans is encoded by the TSPAN18 gene.

References

Further reading